Alireza Zarrindast (born 1945 in Tabriz, Iran) is an Iranian Cinematographer. He is the brother of Tony Zarrindast.

Notes

External links
 
 Alireza Zarrindast in Internet database of Soureh Cinema

Living people
People from Tabriz
1945 births
Iranian cinematographers